Altin Bytyçi (born 14 January 2001) is a Kosovan professional footballer who plays as a centre-back for Albanian club FK Kukësi.

Club career

Međimurje
On 30 January 2020, Bytyçi joined Croatian Second Football League side Međimurje. On 21 February 2020, he was named as a Međimurje substitute for the first time in a league match against Hrvatski Dragovoljac.

Return to Kukësi
On 12 September 2020, Bytyçi signed a three-year contract with Kategoria Superiore club Kukësi. His debut with Kukësi came on 1 November in the 2020–21 Albanian Cup first round against Maliqi after being named in the starting line-up. Seven days after debut, Bytyçi made his league debut in a 0–2 home defeat against Partizani Tirana after being named in the starting line-up.

International career

Under-19
On 20 May 2019, Bytyçi received a call-up from Kosovo U19 for the friendly matches against Albania U19. His debut with Kosovo U19 came fourteen days later in the first friendly match against Albania U19. Two days after debut, Bytyçi scored his first goal for Kosovo U19 in his second appearance for the country in a 1–4 defeat over Albania U19.

Under-21

Albania
On 20 March 2021, Bytyçi received a call-up from Albania U21 for a training camp held from 22–30 March 2021 and for unofficial friendly matches against Tirana and Bylis.

Return to Kosovo
On 3 November 2021, Bytyçi received a call-up from Kosovo U21 for the 2023 UEFA European Under-21 Championship qualification match against Albania U21.

References

External links

2001 births
Living people
People from Suva Reka
Association football central defenders
Kosovan footballers
Kosovo youth international footballers
Kosovo under-21 international footballers
Kosovan expatriate footballers
Kosovan expatriate sportspeople in Albania
Kosovan expatriate sportspeople in Croatia
Albanian footballers
Albanian expatriate footballers
Albanian expatriate sportspeople in Croatia
KF Besa players
Kategoria Superiore players
FK Kukësi players
KF Laçi players
First Football League (Croatia) players
NK Međimurje players